Oregon Route 540 (OR 540) is an Oregon state highway running from North Bend to Cape Arago State Park. OR 540 is known as the Cape Arago Highway No. 240 (see Oregon highways and routes).

OR 540 was established in 2003 as part of Oregon's project to assign route numbers to highways that previously were not assigned.  It was signed at its intersection with US 101 in 2013.

Route description 

OR 540 begins at the intersection of Sheridan Avenue and Virginia Avenue in North Bend. Sheridan Avenue carries the northbound traffic of US 101. It travels west along Virginia Avenue, turning south onto Broadway Street, then west again on Newmark Avenue where it enters the city of Coos Bay. At the western edge of Coos Bay, OR 540 turns southwest, traveling through the towns of Barview and Charleston. For its remaining length, the highway skirts the coastline to Cape Arago State Park, where it ends, becoming Cape Arago Road.

History 

OR 540 was assigned to the Cape Arago Highway in 2003.

Major intersections

References 
 Oregon Department of Transportation, Descriptions of US and Oregon Routes, https://web.archive.org/web/20051102084300/http://www.oregon.gov/ODOT/HWY/TRAFFIC/TEOS_Publications/PDF/Descriptions_of_US_and_Oregon_Routes.pdf, page 25.
 Oregon Department of Transportation, Cape Arago Highway No. 240, ftp://ftp.odot.state.or.us/tdb/trandata/maps/slchart_pdfs_1980_to_2002/Hwy240_2000.pdf

540
Transportation in Coos County, Oregon
North Bend, Oregon